Kuril Islands earthquake may refer to:

 1963 Kuril Islands earthquake
 1975 Kuril Islands earthquake
 1994 Kuril Islands earthquake
 2006 Kuril Islands earthquake
 2007 Kuril Islands earthquake